"U mad" or "you mad" is an internet catchphrase commonly associated with trolling. The phrase is used both as a statement and a question. It was popularized after an incident on The O'Reilly Factor involving rapper Cam'ron and record producer Damon Dash in 2003. Host Bill O'Reilly was debating the effect of drugged out rappers on children. When O'Reilly began to interrupt Dash, Cam'ron stated, "Why don’t you want to let him talk? You mad. You mad." In 2004, the phrase was added to Urban Dictionary, citing Cam'ron as the coiner.

The phrase caused controversy in 2011 when students at Kirtland High School in Ohio displayed a banner reading "YOU MAD BRO" at a football game against a rival school. The president of the local NAACP chapter, who was present at the game, accused the students of racial intimidation.

"You mad, bro?" quote gained worldwide notoriety in 2012 after Seattle Seahawks cornerback Richard Sherman yelled it at Tom Brady after the Hawks defeated the New England Patriots. It was later turned into a meme featuring a photo of Sherman yelling at Brady with the line "U MAD BRO?"

"U Mad" is also the name of a 2015 single by Vic Mensa featuring Kanye West.

References

Hip hop phrases
Internet memes